Amanda armata, the night sky nudibranch, is a species of sea slug, specifically an aeolid nudibranch. It is a marine gastropod mollusc in the family Facelinidae.

Distribution
This species is endemic to South Africa, having only been found around the coast on both sides of the Cape Peninsula, intertidally to about 15 m.

Description
The night sky nudibranch grows to between 10 and 20 mm in total length. It is a slender, pale-bodied nudibranch with groups of brown cerata having large white spots running down the length of the body. Its rhinophores are annulate, and there is a pair of elongated oral tentacles with white blotches.

Ecology
The food and egg mass of this nudibranch are unknown.

References

External links
 https://web.archive.org/web/20170921190709/http://www.nudipixel.net/species/amanda_armata/

Facelinidae
Gastropods described in 1954